Bonghwasan may refer to:
 Bonghwasan (Namsan-myeon, Chuncheon) in the city of Chuncheon, Gangwon-do in South Korea. 487 metres.
 Bonghwasan (North Jeolla) in the city of Namwon and the county of Jangsu, Jeollabuk-do. 920 metres.

See also 
 Ponghwasan